Henry Thode (13 January 1857 – 19 November 1920) was a German art historian. He was born in Dresden and died in Copenhagen.

Biography
He was an art historian at the time of the Weimar republic. He wrote against the prevailing ideas of the time that art from outside of Germany, such as French Impressionism was superior to traditional academic or native art.

Thode believed that great German art should illustrate technical skill, realism and the German spirit.
He also felt that art should be understood by all, not just academics and the bourgeois.
Thode wrote a great deal about how the modern art of the Impressionists attempted to both destroy 'true' German art and the 'true' German spirit.

His philosophies were very important in the formulation of the cultural policies of the Third Reich, especially in terms of 'degenerate' art.

His wife was Daniela von Bülow, first daughter of Hans von Bülow and Cosima Liszt.

References
 Clinefelter, J.L. (2005), Artists for the Reich, New York: Berg Press.

External links 
 Biography

1857 births
1920 deaths
Writers from Dresden
German art historians
People from the Kingdom of Saxony
German male non-fiction writers